Alien Invasion Arizona is a 2007 science fiction film directed by Dustin Rikert and starring Daniel Southworth, Avery Clyde, Sam McConkey, and James McBride.  It is set in the fictional town of Salena, Arizona. It is also entitled The Salena Incident and was a straight to DVD release produced by and distributed by Lionsgate.

Plot 
After a mysterious, extraterrestrial object crashes in the mining town of Salena, Arizona, the government dispatches a team of Marines to contain the possible threat.  Meanwhile, a group of death row inmates ambush their prison bus and take the guards hostage.  The criminals include Brando, from the Italian Mafia, Colburn, an African-American gangster, Alano, a Hispanic gang member, and a Neo-Nazi skinhead named Albany.  Arriving in the seemingly deserted town, they come across Special Ops Captain Bradley, the sole survivor of a horrible carnage that decimated the rest of his unit.  With time running out, the group puts their differences and racial prejudices aside to combat the threat of the savage aliens hunting them in the mining tunnels below and the peril above from a squad of fighter planes sent to bomb the town to oblivion.

Cast 
Daniel Southworth   ...Captain John Bradley
Avery Clyde   ...Dr. Taylor Kacey
Sam McConkey   ...Kevin Porter
James McBride   ...Brando Enzio
Larry 'Tank' Jones   ...Colburn Waylon
Paulino Hemmer   ...Alano Martinez
Joseph Moore   ...Albany Gavin
Robert Harter   ...Mark Colby
Philip Tiboni   ...Larry Kendall
Shannon Alexander   ...Adreana Cammeo
Cathy Rankin   ...Gia Dante
Wade Rikert   ...Eddie Thompson
Brendan Guy Murphy   ...Vincent Enzio
Soon Hee Newbold   ...Cindi Lee
Robert Lennon   ...Rock Sanders
Patrick Logan Pace   ...Kyle Matthewson

Film location 

While the film is set in fictional Salena, Arizona, many of the scenes are actually filmed in real-life Superior, Arizona.  Shots of the town and surrounding area are seen throughout the film.

The film depicts a prison in Salena, but the town  of Superior does not have a prison. The building used in the film for the prison is actually an old elementary school.

References

External links
 
 

2007 films
2000s science fiction horror films
American science fiction horror films
Films set in Arizona
Films shot in Arizona
2000s English-language films
2000s American films